1935 in philosophy

Events

Publications

Philosophical literature 
 George Santayana, The Last Puritan

Births 
 February 2 - Dariush Shayegan, Iranian cultural theorist and philosopher (d. 2018)
 February 17 - Sara Ruddick (d. 2011)
 April 22 - Jerry Fodor, American cognitive scientist (d. 2017)
 May 12 - Sophie Oluwole (d. 2018)
 October 11 - Daniel Quinn (d. 2018)
 October 31 - David Harvey 
 November 1 - Edward Said (d. 2003)
 December 14 - Anthony Wilden (d. 2019)

Deaths 
 August 9 - Edmond Goblot
 December 31 - Miguel de Unamuno

References 

Philosophy
20th-century philosophy
Philosophy by year